CSS Livingston was constructed at New Orleans, La., during 1861, a ferry or towboat converted to a warship on the ways by John Hughes and Co. In January 1862 she was taken up the Mississippi River to Columbus, Ky., to be fitted for service and during much of that year operated in the vicinity of Island No. 10, with Comdr. R. F. Pinkney, CSN, in command. She formed part of the flotilla, at one time numbering 17 vessels, under command of Brig.

Gen. M. Lovell, CSA. Secretary of the Navy S. R. Mallory wrote General Lovell on 23 January 1862: "The Livingston you will find to be, I think, a superior steamer, capable of doing capital service. Later she ascended the Yazoo River in Mississippi where she was burned by the Confederates on 26 June 1862 to prevent capture.

An opinion of her somewhat divergent from Sec. Mallory's was expressed by Midshipman James M. Morgan, CSN, who served in her: "There had also been built (from designs by a locomotive roundhouse architect, I suppose) the most wonderful contraption that was ever seen afloat, called the Livingston; she carried 6 guns, 3 for'd and 3 abaft the paddle boxes, and she was almost circular in shape. She was so slow that her crew facetiously complained that when she was going downstream at full speed they could not sleep on account of the drift logs catching up with her and bumping against the stern."

References 

 

Ships of the Confederate States Navy
Gunboats of the Confederate States Navy
Ships